WatsUp TV Africa Music Video Awards (commonly abbreviated as a WAMVA) is an award presented by the TV channel WatsUp TV to honor the best in the African music videos scene.

The award was launched in Accra, Ghana in September 2016 coupled with the announcement of Nominees across 20 categories.

WAMVA will be honoring Anglophone and the Francophone artists from the Africa music video medium.

On 28 December, winners of the maiden edition were announced in Accra ahead of a Made in Africa concert to be hosted in 2017 which will feature all winners.

2016

 Venue: Paparazzi- Lizzy Sports Complex, Accra
 Hosts: Gladys Wiredu & Prince Akpah

Winners

 African Video of the Year - Diamond Platnumz ft P-Square - Kidogo - Tanzania
 Best African Video Director - Godfather - Kidogo – Nigeria
 WAMVA Special Recognition Award - Mr Eazi ft Efya – Skin Tight - Nigeria
 WatsUp TV Viewers Choice Awards - Desiigner – Panda - United States
 Best African Newcomer Video - Harmonize ft Diamond Platnumz - BADO - Tanzania
 Best African Reggae/Dancehall Video - Shatta Wale - Chopkiss - Ghana
 Best International Video - Beyoncé - Formation - United States
 Best Afro Pop Video - Scientific ft Quincy B - Rotate - Liberia
 Best African Hip Hop Video - Iba One - Dokèra - Mali
 Best African Rnb Video - Ali Kiba - Aje - Tanzania
 Best African Traditional Video - Tay Grin ft 2baba - Chipapapa - Malawi
 Best African Performance - DJ Arafat - Concert a Korhogo - Côte d'Ivoire
 Best African Dance Video - Oudy 1er - Lokolo - Guinea
 Best African Combo Video - Diamond Platnumz ft AKA (rapper) - Make Me Sing - Tanzania
 Best African Male Video - Diamond Platnumz ft P-Square - Kidogo - Tanzania
 Best African Female Video - Vivian Chidid - Wuyuma - Senegal
 Best East African Video - Ali Kiba - Aje - Tanzania
 Best Central African Video - Ferré Gola ft Victoria Kimani - Tucheze - DR Congo
 Best North African Video - Ibtissam Tiskat  - Ma Fi Mn Habibi - Morocco
 Best South African Video - Cassper Nyovest - War Ready - South Africa
 Best West African Video - DJ Arafat - Maplôrly - Côte d'Ivoire
 Best African Group Video - Navy Kenzo - Kamatia – Tanzania

References

African music awards
Annual events
International music awards
Music video awards